James T. Luken (December 31, 1921 – July 12, 1979) was an American politician and labor union leader of the Democratic party, who served as mayor of Cincinnati, Ohio, in the 1970s.

Luken was a local leader of the Milk Driver's Union, a subsidiary of the Teamsters. Luken was one of the few Teamsters who stood up to the corrupt leadership of Teamsters President Jimmy Hoffa. Luken withdrew the dairy workers from the Teamsters Union and testified against Hoffa before the United States Senate.

Luken served in the Ohio House of Representatives and on the Cincinnati city council before becoming mayor.

Luken's brother Tom Luken and his nephew Charlie Luken, both served as U.S. representatives and mayors of Cincinnati.

Luken died in 1979 and is interred at New St. Joseph Cemetery.

References

External links
Luken, James T. at politicalgraveyard.com

1921 births
1979 deaths
Mayors of Cincinnati
Cincinnati City Council members
Democratic Party members of the Ohio House of Representatives
20th-century American politicians